John Johnson Allen (August 4, 1842 – January 20, 1926) was an American lawyer and politician from New York.

Life 
Allen was born on August 4, 1842 in Utica, New York, the son of Joseph Dona Allen and Eliza R. Johnson. His father was chief engineer of the Erie Canal and consulting engineer of the Erie Railroad and the Chicago and North Western Railroad. His maternal grandfather John Johnson was Surveyor-General of Vermont. He was a descendent of Samuel Allen and Myles Standish.

Allen moved to Vermont with his parents when he was young. He attended the City Academy in Burlington, and when he was sixteen he entered the University of Vermont. He graduated from there with honors in 1862. He then began studying law, and while studying he accepted a position on the staff of the Provost Marshal in New York City. In the bureau's last year, he was in charge of the Fourth Provost District. After the bureau was abolished, he resumed his law studies and entered Columbia Law School, graduating from there with honors in 1866. Shortly after his graduation, he was appointed Assistant United States Attorney for the Eastern District of New York under Benjamin D. Silliman. He continued to hold the position under Silliman's successor Benjamin F. Tracy. He resigned in March 1873, after which he began practicing law in Brooklyn.

In 1873, Allen was elected to the New York State Assembly as a Republican, representing the Kings County 2nd District (Wards 3, 4, and 11 of Brooklyn). He served in the Assembly in 1874. In 1874, the United States Circuit Court appointed him U.S. Chief Supervisor of Elections for the Eastern District of New York, which included Long Island and Staten Island. He served in that position until 1894. He was also a United States commissioner from 1874 to 1899 and a master in chancery for over 25 years. He was a director of different corporations, and had a summer homestead in Burlington owned by his family for over a century.

In 1920, the University of Vermont gave Allen an honorary LL.D. along with Massachusetts Governor Calvin Coolidge. He was president of the Vermont Society of Brooklyn and the Brooklyn Republican Club. He was a member of Phi Beta Kappa, Sigma Phi, the New England Society of New York, the National Geographic Society, the Union League Club. He was also deputy governor of the General Society of Colonial Wars. In 1870, he married Louisa A. Shaler of Pittsburgh, Pennsylvania, daughter of Charles Shaler. His children were Marion Shaler, Eliza, Marguerite Louisa.

Allen died of pneumonia at his home at 129 Columbia Heights on January 20, 1926. He was buried in the family plot in Lakeview Cemetery in Burlington, Vermont.

References

External links 

 The Political Graveyard

1842 births
1926 deaths
Politicians from Utica, New York
University of Vermont alumni
Columbia Law School alumni
19th-century American lawyers
20th-century American lawyers
Lawyers from Brooklyn
Politicians from Brooklyn
19th-century American politicians
Republican Party members of the New York State Assembly
People from Brooklyn Heights
Deaths from pneumonia in New York City
Burials at Lakeview Cemetery (Burlington, Vermont)